Vincent "Vinnie" Penna Jr, who has primarily performed using the stage name Wayne Grayson, is an American voice actor and director primarily known for his work at 4Kids Entertainment, Central Park Media, Media Blasters, NYAV Post and DuArt Film and Video.

Grayson played Joey Wheeler in the English-language version of Yu-Gi-Oh! Duel Monsters, Tokageroh in the English language versions of Shaman King and Michelangelo in the 2003 TV series Teenage Mutant Ninja Turtles.

Filmography

Animation
Arte – Angelo Parker
Animation Runner Kuromi – Hassaku Hozumi
Animation Runner Kuromi 2 – Hassaku Hozumi
Astroblast! – Comet
 Emma – A Victorian Romance – Richard Jones
 G.I. Joe: Sigma 6 – Buzzer Huntik: Secrets & Seekers – Galen, Master Storm, Otto, Silent Soldier, Suit Member, Governor of Sutos
 Lu over the Wall – Kujirai
 Mazinger Z: Infinity – Koji Kabuto
 The Prince of Tennis II: Hyotei vs. Rikkai Game of Future – Masaharu Nio
 Shaman King – Tokageroh, Chrysler, Ronny of Team "Doom", Fudou
 Tai Chi Chasers – Luka, Ave
 Teenage Mutant Ninja Turtles – Michelangelo
 Winx Club – Jared (Season 2, 4Kids), Tim (Timmy) (Season 7, Nickelodeon)World of Winx – Gomez
 Yu-Gi-Oh!: The Dark Side of Dimensions – Joey Wheeler, Solomon Muto
 The Octonauts – Peso (American version)
 Birdboy: The Forgotten Children – Parrot, Rat Father, Jonathan
 Ratatoing  – Marcelle Toing (English Version)
 The Little Panda Fighter – Sweet Bear (English Version)
 Rainbow Butterfly Unicorn Kitty – Miguel (as Arturo Sandoval)
 44 Cats – Wrench, Milky, Choc, Brutus 
 Denver, the Last Dinosaur – Tom (as Arturo Sandoval)
 GoGoRiki – Wolliriki
 One Piece  – Eneru

 Live-action 
 Adventures in Voice Acting – Himself
 Beautiful Beast – Shui (English dub)
 Chelsea's Chappaqua – Joe
 Close Your Eyes and Hold Me – Takayanagi (English dub)
 Exorcists Local 667 – Flammi/Flammius
 Exte: Hair Dimensions – Jiro Tamura (English dub)
 New York Ninja – Rattail Man.
 Thumb Wrestling Federation – Vini Vidi Victory, Gary the Intern
 Ultraman Tiga – Daigo Madoka/Ultraman Tiga

Video games 
 Brothers in Arms 3: Sons of War – Cole Wright
 Grand Theft Auto V – The Local Population
 Max Payne 3 – The Local Population
 Red Dead Redemption 2 – The Local Pedestrian Population (uncredited)
 Teenage Mutant Ninja Turtles: Smash-Up – Michelangelo
 Teenage Mutant Ninja Turtles: Turtles in Time Re-Shelled – Michelangelo, Krang, Metalhead
 Thor: The Dark World – Fandral, Dark Elf 1, Einherjar 4

References

External links
 
 
 

American male stage actors
Year of birth missing (living people)
Place of birth missing (living people)
American male video game actors
American male voice actors
Living people
20th-century American male actors
21st-century American male actors